The Misty River is a river in Fiordland, New Zealand. It rises to the east of Irene Pass and flows westward into Teardrop Lake and on to Kaikiekie / Bradshaw Sound.

See also
List of rivers of New Zealand

References

Rivers of Fiordland